The Embassy of Brazil in Lima represents the permanent diplomatic mission of Brazil in Peru.

The current Brazilian ambassador to Peru is Sérgio França Danese.

History
The embassy was installed in its current headquarters in Miraflores in the 1920s. The current architectural complex was inaugurated on September 7, 1980, and follows the modernist style, with the exception of the Santos Pavilion, which is more classic. The Chancellery is located in Miraflores, 16 km from Jorge Chávez Airport and 10 km from Lima's Plaza Mayor. The Official Residence of the Embassy is located in Santiago de Surco.

See also
List of ambassadors of Peru to Brazil

References

Brazil
Peru
Brazil–Peru relations